A Kerry County Council election was held in County Kerry in Ireland on 24 May 2019 as part of that year's local elections. All 33 councillors were elected for a five-year term of office from 6 local electoral areas (LEAs) by single transferable vote.

Following a recommendation of the 2018 Boundary Committee, the boundaries of the LEAs were altered from those used in the 2014 elections. Its terms of reference required no change in the total number of councillors but set a lower maximum LEA size of seven councillors, exceeded by three of the four 2014 LEAs. Other changes were necessitated by population shifts revealed by the 2016 census.

Results by party

Results by local electoral area

Castleisland

Corca Dhuibhne

Kenmare

Killarney

Listowel

Tralee

Results by gender

Changes since 2019
† On 2 September 2019 Tralee Sinn Féin Cllr Toiréasa Ferris announced she was retiring from politics with immediate effect. Cathal Foley was co-opted to fill the vacancy on 21 October 2019.
†† Tralee Fianna Fáil Cllr Norma Foley was elected a Teachta Dála (TD) for Kerry at the 2020 general election. Johnnie Wall was co-opted to fill the vacancy on 25 February 2020.
††† Tralee Sinn Féin Cllr Pa Daly was elected a TD for Kerry at the 2020 general election. Deirdre Ferris was co-opted to fill the vacancy on 25 February 2020.

Footnotes

Sources

References

2019 Irish local elections
2019